MTV Idol was a French television channel launched on November 30, 2005 owned by Viacom specializing in  music and reality-shows, plus covering of news of artists of this era that have influenced French and French-speaking generations. It stopped broadcasting on 17 November 2015.

MTV Idol was founded in 2005 to serve French territories and was a retro channel and featured rerun of very popular cult broadcasting and programming of the MTV era including those of MTV Unplugged and reruns of popular series notably Beavis and Butt-Head. MTV Idol formed a package offering with other affiliated channels MTV, MTV Base and MTV Pulse. It was also available since 20 October 2009 until its cancellation on PlayStation Portable format.

MTV Idol ceased broadcasting in France on November 17, 2015, along with MTV Base and MTV Pulse, to be replaced by French version of MTV Hits and the new My MTV service.

External links 
MTV Idol France - presentation, screenshots

MTV
Television channels and stations established in 2005
Television channels and stations disestablished in 2015
Defunct television channels in France
2005 establishments in France
2015 disestablishments in France
Music organizations based in France